Corenc is a commune in the département of Isère in southeastern France. It is part of the Grenoble urban unit (agglomeration).

Geography
Corenc is situated in the Alps near the center of the département of Isère.

Population

Economy

See also
 Mélanie Calvat

References

External links

 Municipality of Corenc

Communes of Isère
Isère communes articles needing translation from French Wikipedia